David Paul Mills is a British chemist and a Professor in the Department of Chemistry at The University of Manchester. His research typically investigates the chemistry of the lanthanide and actinide f-block elements. This is generally based on the synthesis of new f-block complexes, structural and bonding properties and their uses in different fields including in nuclear fuel cycles, energy and single molecule magnets.

Education 
Mills completed his MChem in 2004 at Cardiff University where he finished his masters project with Prof. Cameron Jones. Upon graduation, he continued to read for his Doctor of Philosophy degree with Prof. Jones on Investigations into the Reactivity of an Anionic Gallium(I) N-Heterocyclic Carbene Analogue and successfully gained his PhD in 2007.

Research and career 
Mills completed his postdoctoral research with Prof. Stephen Liddle at the University of Nottingham before moving to the University of Manchester in 2012 as a Lecturer. In 2017, he was promoted to the Senior Lecturer position and in 2019 was promoted to Reader in the Department of Chemistry at the University of Manchester. He was promoted to the position of Professor in June 2021.

Mill's research is generally on lanthanide and Actinide chemistry and is specifically based on the synthesis of new f-block complexes, structural and bonding properties and their uses in different fields including in nuclear fuel cycles, energy and single molecule magnets.

Apart from research and lecturing, Mills has also worked at the Royal Society of Chemistry, Manchester as the District Local Section Science Secretary and the University of Manchester Royal Society of Chemistry representative from (2013-2017), the Nuclear Materials Control Officer for the Centre for Radiochemical Research (2014-2019) and also as the co-organiser of Royal Society of Chemistry Manchester Dalton Northern (2015), Dial-a-Molecule Conference (2015) and Royal Society of Chemistry Manchester Northwest Organic and Dalton Division Awards Symposium (2013).

Notable work 

In 2017, Mills and Nicholas F. Chilton led a research on the magnetic hysteresis at 60 Kelvin in dysprosocenium. This was the first time a higher temperature magnetic hysteresis has been observed, with the previously record being 30 K. The research introduced the ability to use liquid nitrogen instead of more expensive liquid helium during the magnetic hysteresis phenomenon which led to the attention of data storage server companies as the research introduced the potential of reducing both costs and energy requirements of data servers.

In 2016, Mills also confirmed the capability to use pulsed EPR spectroscopy to measure the covalency of actinide complexes in research in collaboration with Floriana Tuna and Professor Eric Mcinnes at the University of Manchester. Prior to this research, the extent of covalency in actinide complexes was less understood as this nature of bonding was not studied due to limited technology and methods of experimentation at the time. The use of pulsed EPR spectroscopy was able to determine the covalency of thorium(III) and Uranium(III) complexes for the first time and this paved the way to further research on the use of these complexes in the separation and recycling of nuclear waste.

Awards and nominations 
 Excellent Academic Advisor Award (2020) 
 Bill Newton Award (2019)
 Periodic Table of Younger Chemists (2018) 
Harrison-Meldola Memorial Prize (2018)

Major Reviews and Publications

The following research and review papers by David Mills has been classified as "hot papers" from the journals in which the paper is published.

1. Reviews

2. Research Publications

References

External links
 

Living people
British chemists
Academics of the University of Manchester
21st-century chemists
Alumni of Cardiff University
Date of birth missing (living people)
Year of birth missing (living people)